Sita is the consort of Lord Rama (incarnation of Vishnu ) and an avatar of Sri Lakshmi, the Hindu goddess.

Sita, Seeta, Seetha or SITA may also refer to :

Places and jurisdictions 
 Sita, Mauritania, a former Ancient city and bishopric in Roman Africa, now a Latin Catholic titular see
 Sita, a village in Spermezeu Commune, Bistriţa-Năsăud County, Romania
 Seetha River
 Seeta, Uganda, a township in Uganda

People with the given name

Politics and royalty
Sita bint Fahd Al Damir, Saudi royal
Sita Devi (Maharani of Baroda), former queen of Baroda
Sita Devi (Maharani of Kapurthala), former queen of Kapurthala
Sita Devi Boudel, Nepalese politician
Sita Tiwaree, Thai politician

Arts and entertainment
Sita (singer) (born 1980), Dutch pop singer
Sita Chan (1987–2013), Hong Kong singer and actress
Seetha Doraiswamy (born 1926), Jalatharangam and Carnatic Musician
Seetha (actress), Tamil film actress
Seeta Devi (actress), Indian actress
Seetha (Malayalam actress), Indian film actress in Malayalam movies during the 1990s
Sita Devi (painter) (1914–2005), Indian artist

Other
 Sita, favorite wife of Bhagat Raja Pipaji
 Seetha Hallett (born 1979), British TV presenter

People with the surname 
 Kasirayi Sita (born 1978), Zimbabwean long-distance runner

Films 
Seeta (1933 film), 1933 film by Sisir Bhaduri
Seeta (1934 film), 1934 film by Debaki Bose that was featured in the 2nd Venice International Film Festival
Seetha (1960 film), a Malayalam language film directed by M Kunchacko
Seetha (1967 film), a Tamil language film directed by A. P. Nagarajan
Seetha (1970 film), a Kannada language film directed by Vadiraj
Seetha (1980 film), a Malayalam language film directed by P Govindan
Seetha (1990 film), a Tamil language film directed by S.A.Chandrasekhar
Sita (2019 film), a Telugu language film directed by Teja

Companies 
SITA (IT company), a multinational aviation information technology company
SITA (waste management company), a waste management subsidiary of the French multinational company Suez
SITA UK, the UK arm of SITA waste management
Sita Air, an airline based in Sinamangal Ward, Kathmandu, Nepal
Transit Systems Victoria, a bus operator in Melbourne, Australia formerly known as Sita Buslines
SITA SOC, South African State Information Technology Agency
SITA (ISP), South African Based Internet Service Provider

Others 
 Sītā, a goddess of land fertility appealed to in passing in Rigveda book 4 hymn 57 line 6
 244 Sita, an asteroid
 Swedish interactive thresholding algorithm or SITA, a test to determine visual field loss in eyes
 Search incident to arrest
 Sita, a 1976 book by Kate Millett